Maple Grove Farm (544 Long Creek Road) in Dover, Tennessee, was added to the National Register of Historic Places on January 31, 2019.

References

Dover, Tennessee
National Register of Historic Places in Tennessee